Longhope Hill is a  geological Site of Special Scientific Interest in Gloucestershire, notified in 1989.

Location and geology
The site is in the Forest of Dean near Longhope in west Gloucestershire. The site is of particular importance for research of late Silurian rocks in the southern Welsh Borders region. The rock exposures show extensive and continuous section through the Lower and Upper Longhope Beds of the Ludfordian. These beds are overlain by Clifford's Mesne Sandstone. There are macrofaunas present and preserved marine microfloral assemblies.

References

SSSI Source
 Natural England SSSI information on the citation
 Natural England SSSI information on the Longhope Hill unit

External links
 Natural England (SSSI information)

Sites of Special Scientific Interest in Gloucestershire
Sites of Special Scientific Interest notified in 1989
Forest of Dean